Viswas ("Vis") Raghavan is the Chief Executive Officer for J.P. Morgan. in Europe, the Middle East and Africa (EMEA). In 2020, he was additionally named co-head of the firm's Global Investment Banking business.

Career 
Raghavan is CEO and member of the Board of J.P. Morgan Securities Plc, J.P. Morgan Europe Limited and Chairman of the London Branch of J.P. Morgan Chase Bank, N.A.

He joined J.P. Morgan in 2000 from Lehman Brothers, initially to head up its equity-linked and derivatives capital markets business for Europe and Asia. 

He has since held various senior jobs at the bank, including head of International Capital Markets and global head of Equity Capital Markets. 

Raghavan grew up in India and studied physics at the University of Bombay before completing a postgraduate degree in electronic engineering and computer science at Aston University in the U.K. He also qualified as a Chartered Accountant with Ernst & Young, and it was then that he started thinking about a career in investment banking. While at Aston University, he worked as a systems engineer at General Signal’s European headquarters in Birmingham and in 2016, he was awarded an honorary doctorate in science from Aston University.

In a 2017 press interview, he described banking as “the perfect marriage of quantitative skills and real-life business situations. You’re at the cutting edge of strategic thinking, and there is immense satisfaction and pleasure that comes from helping clients – companies, investors, governments and supranationals – with their strategic business and funding needs.”

References

Living people
Indian investment bankers
Year of birth missing (living people)